Boston Blow–Up! is an album by jazz baritone saxophonist Serge Chaloff. Capitol Records released the album in 1955. It was recorded on April 4 and 5, 1955 at Capitol Studios in New York City.  Stan Kenton produced the album as part of his "Kenton Presents" series.

Reception 

David Szatmary, writing for the All Music Guide to Jazz, describes Boston Blow–Up! as a "swinging, boppish session from a musician who was once a mainstay of Woody Herman's band."

Richard Cook and Brian Morton of The Penguin Guide to Jazz include the Definitive Records pairing of Blue Serge with Boston Blow–Up! as part of a suggested "Core Collection", and give the combined release a four-star rating (of a possible four).  The Penguin Guide notes that while Boston Blow-Up! is less exciting than Blue Serge, its rendition of "Body and Soul" is "scorching".

Scott Yanow, writing for Allmusic.com, describes Boston Blow–Up! as an "excellent session" on which Chaloff "is very much in prime form".

Track listing

Personnel 
 Serge Chaloff – baritone saxophone
 Everett Evans – bass
 Boots Mussulli – alto saxophone
 Herb Pomeroy – trumpet
 Ray Santisi – piano
 Jimmy Zitano – drums

Release history 
Boston Blow-Up! was once available on CD only as part of a Mosaic Records box set. In 2004, Definitive Records released Blue Serge and Boston Blow–Up! together on a single CD, which presented the tracks in reverse chronological order of recording. In 2006, Capitol Jazz released Boston Blow–Up! with three extra tracks.

References 

 

Serge Chaloff albums
1955 albums
Capitol Records albums
Albums produced by Stan Kenton
Blue Note Records albums